Mayra Bueno Silva (born August 22, 1991) is a Brazilian female mixed martial artist who competes in the Bantamweight division of the Ultimate Fighting Championship. As of March 7, 2023, she is #10 in the UFC women's bantamweight rankings.

Background
Born in Uberlandia, Silva has lived and trained in gyms in Campinas and São Paulo since January 2015, a couple months before she made her professional debut.

Mixed martial arts career

Early career
Starting her career in 2016, Silva only needed 3 fights on the regional Brazilian scene, winning all three and the Batalha MMA Bantamweight title in the process, to be invited onto Dana White's Contender Series Brazil 1. Making quick work of Mayana Souza dos Santos via ninja choke in the first round, she earned a contract to the UFC.

Ultimate Fighting Championship
Silva made her debut on September 22, 2018, facing Gillian Robertson at UFC Fight Night: Santos vs. Anders. She won the fight via a submission in round one.

Silva faced Maryna Moroz on March 14, 2020, at UFC Fight Night: Lee vs. Oliveira. She lost the fight via unanimous decision. This fight earned her the Fight of the Night award.

Silva faced Mara Romero Borella on September 19, 2020, at UFC Fight Night 178. She won the fight via a submission in round one.

Silva faced Montana De La Rosa on February 27, 2021, at UFC Fight Night 186. After three rounds of fighting, the fight ended with a draw from the judges.

Replacing injured Ji Yeon Kim, Silva was expected to face Poliana Botelho on May 1, 2021, at UFC on ESPN 23. Bueno suffered a back injury in late March and she was pulled from the bout.

Silva was scheduled to face Manon Fiorot on September 25, 2021, at UFC 266. The bout was postponed to UFC Fight Night 195 due to COVID-19 protocols. Silva lost the fight via unanimous decision.

Returning to Bantamweight, Silva faced Wu Yanan on April 16, 2022 at UFC on ESPN 34. She won the fight via unanimous decision. This fight earned her the Fight of the Night award.

Silva faced Stephanie Egger on August 6, 2022 at UFC on ESPN 40. She won the fight via an armbar submission in round one.

Silva faced Lina Länsberg on February 18, 2023, at UFC Fight Night 219. She won the fight via a kneebar submission in round two. This win earned her the Performance of the Night award.

Silva is scheduled to face Miesha Tate on June 3, 2023 at UFC Fight Night 226.

Personal life
Silva's girlfriend is a UFC alum Gloria de Paula, they met in 2016.

Championships and accomplishments
Ultimate Fighting Championship
Fight of the Night (Two times) 
Performance of the Night (One time) 

Batalha MMA
BMMA Vacant Bantamweight Championship (one time)

Mixed martial arts record

|-
|Win
|align=center|10–2–1
|Lina Länsberg
|Submission (kneebar)
|UFC Fight Night: Andrade vs. Blanchfield
|
|align=center|2
|align=center|4:46
|Las Vegas, Nevada, United States
|
|-
|Win
|align=center|9–2–1
|Stephanie Egger
|Submission (armbar)
|UFC on ESPN: Santos vs. Hill
|
|align=center|1
|align=center|1:17
|Las Vegas, Nevada, United States
|
|-
|Win
|align=center|8–2–1
|Wu Yanan
|Decision (unanimous)
|UFC on ESPN: Luque vs. Muhammad 2 
|
|align=center|3
|align=center|5:00
|Las Vegas, Nevada, United States
|
|-
|Loss
|align=center|7–2–1
|Manon Fiorot
|Decision (unanimous)
|UFC Fight Night: Ladd vs. Dumont 
|
|align=center|3
|align=center|5:00
|Las Vegas, Nevada, United States
| 
|-
|Draw
|align=center|7–1–1
|Montana De La Rosa
|Draw (majority)
|UFC Fight Night: Rozenstruik vs. Gane
|
|align=center|3
|align=center|5:00
|Las Vegas, Nevada, United States
|
|-
|Win
|align=center|7–1
|Mara Romero Borella
|Submission (armbar)
|UFC Fight Night: Covington vs. Woodley
|
|align=center|1
|align=center|2:29
|Las Vegas, Nevada, United States
|
|-
|Loss
|align=center|6–1
|Maryna Moroz
|Decision (unanimous)
|UFC Fight Night: Lee vs. Oliveira 
|
|align=center|3
|align=center|5:00
|Brasília, Brazil
|
|-
|Win
|align=center|6–0
|Gillian Robertson
|Submission (armbar)
|UFC Fight Night: Santos vs. Anders
|
|align=center| 1
|align=center| 4:55
|São Paulo, Brazil
|
|-
| Win
| align=center| 5–0
| Mayana Souza
| Technical Submission (ninja choke)
|Dana White's Contender Series Brazil 1
|
|align=center|1
|align=center|1:02
|Las Vegas, Nevada, United States
|
|-
| Win
| align=center| 4–0
| Daiane Firmino
| Decision (split)
| Batalha MMA 5
| 
| align=center| 5
| align=center| 5:00
| São Paulo, Brazil
| 
|-
| Win
| align=center| 3–0
| Taynna Taygma
| Submission (armbar)
| Premium Fight Championship 7
| 
| align=center| 1
| align=center| 1:20
| São Paulo, Brazil
|
|-
| Win
| align=center| 2–0
| Marilia Santos
| TKO (retirement)
| Sidney Sibamba Fight 4
| 
| align=center| 1
| align=center| 5:00
| São Paulo, Brazil
|
|-
| Win
| align=center| 1–0
| Shun Lee
| Submission (armbar)
| Delta Fight Club
| 
| align=center| 1
| align=center| 0:58
| Minas Gerais, Brazil
|

See also 
 List of current UFC fighters
 List of female mixed martial artists

References

External links 
  
 

Living people
1991 births
Brazilian female mixed martial artists
LGBT mixed martial artists
Flyweight mixed martial artists
Mixed martial artists utilizing Brazilian jiu-jitsu
Ultimate Fighting Championship female fighters
Brazilian practitioners of Brazilian jiu-jitsu
Female Brazilian jiu-jitsu practitioners
LGBT Brazilian jiu-jitsu practitioners
People from Uberlândia